The Luling–Destrehan Ferry was a ferry across the Mississippi River in the U.S. state of Louisiana, connecting Luling and Destrehan. The ferry was one of three routes then operated by the Louisiana Department of Highways, District 2. The others were the pedestrian Taft–Norco Ferry and the vehicle Edgard–Reserve Ferry. The ferry ceased operation in October 1983 with the opening of the Luling-Destrehan Bridge.

History

MV George Prince ferry disaster

The Luling–Destrehan Ferry, George Prince, was struck by the Norwegian tanker . The ferry was crossing from Destrehan, Louisiana on the East Bank to Luling, Louisiana on the West Bank. Ninety-six passengers and crew were aboard the ferry when it was struck, and seventy-eight died.

See also
List of crossings of the Lower Mississippi River

References

External links
Louisiana Department of Transportation and Development, Locations and Characteristics of Ferries

Ferries of the Mississippi River
Ferries of Louisiana
Transportation in St. Charles Parish, Louisiana